George Eastman (born Luigi Montefiori; August 16, 1942) is an Italian actor and screenwriter well known for his frequent collaborations with notorious director Joe D'Amato. He is most famous for his role as the insane, cannibalistic serial killer Klaus Wortmann in the gory 1980 horror film Antropophagus (aka The Grim Reaper). He also played a similar role in its 1981 follow-up, Absurd. Both films were directed by D'Amato and written by Eastman.

Career
Eastman was born in 1942 in Genoa, Italy and studied at the Centro Sperimentale di Cinematografia in Rome and at the Drama School held of Alessandro Fersen. He took his Americanized alias "George Eastman" when he was cast as a "heavy" in many Spaghetti Westerns made in the late 1960s and early 1970s. In 1972 he played the villain in The Call of the Wild which starred Charlton Heston and was directed by Ken Annakin.

Eastman later became a regular performer in many movies directed by Joe D'Amato, for whom he also wrote many screenplays. Their first work together was Cormack of the Mounties (aka Giubbe Rosse) in 1975.

He was a very familiar face in Italian B-cinema in the early 1980s, being generally cast as a villain, thanks to his towering 6'9" height, and his dark and menacing looks. He co-starred in many Italian science fiction films such as Bronx Warriors, The New Barbarians, Endgame, Ironmaster, 2020 Texas Gladiators and After the Fall of New York. His most famous movie is the gory horror film Anthropophagous, directed by Joe D'Amato in 1980, in which he played the monster. He also starred in D'Amato's Erotic Nights of the Living Dead, Porno Holocaust and Absurd (aka Anthropophagous 2).

Two of his greatest major villain roles were in Rabid Dogs (aka Kidnapped, 1974) and Blastfighter (1984). He appeared in Paramount's 1985 biblical film King David playing Goliath in David's childhood flashback scene. In 1986, he performed as Stefano in the movie Regalo di Natale, directed by Pupi Avati. He also wrote and directed the science fiction film Metamorphosis/ DNA Formula Lethal (produced by Joe D'Amato) in 1990, after which he quit acting to concentrate on his screenwriting. He is now a well regarded author in Italian television and only acts occasionally. (In 2003, he returned to acting in La rivincita di Natale, a  film directed by Pupi Avati.)

Partial filmography

 The Belle Starr Story (1968) directed by Lina Wertmüller
 Chuck Moll (1970)
 The Three Musketeers of the West
 House of Pleasure for Women (1976)
 Orgasmo Nero (1980) directed by Joe D'Amato
 Hard Sensations (1980) directed by Joe D'Amato
 Erotic Nights of the Living Dead (1980) directed by Joe D'Amato (Eastman also wrote this film)
 Absurd (1981) directed by Joe D'Amato (Eastman also wrote this film)
 Caligula: The Untold Story (1982)
 The Bronx Warriors (1982) directed by Enzo G. Castellari
 Endgame (1983) directed by Joe D'Amato (Eastman also wrote this film)
 Detective School Dropouts (1986) directed by Filippo Ottoni
 Hands of Steel (1986) a.k.a. Fists of Steel,  a.k.a. Vendetta Dal Futuro, directed by Sergio Martino
 Christmas Present (1986) directed by Pupi Avati
 Delirium/Photos of Joy (1987)  directed by Lamberto Bava
 Crystal or Ash, Fire or Wind, as Long as It's Love (1989)  directed by Lina Wertmüller
 Metamorphosis/Regenerator (1990) a.k.a. DNA Formula Lethal (Eastman wrote and directed this film)
 Christmas Rematch (2004) directed by Pupi Avati

Screenplays 
 Giubbe rosse (1974) aka Red Coats, aka Cormack of the Mounties, directed by Joe D'Amato
 Candido Erotico (1978)
 La Ragazza del Vagone Letto (1979)
 The Great Alligator River (1979) directed by Sergio Martino (Eastman got plot credit only)
 Sesso nero/ Black Sex (1980) directed by Joe D'Amato
 Erotic Nights of the Living Dead (1980) directed by Joe D'Amato (Eastman also co-starred in this film)
 Absurd/Rosso sangue (1981) directed by Joe D'Amato (Eastman co-starred in this film as the monster)
 Caligula: The Untold Story (1982) directed by Joe D'Amato
 Endgame (1983) directed by Joe D'Amato (Eastman co-starred in this film as well)
 Stage Fright (1987 film) (1987) a.k.a. Deliria, directed by Michele Soavi (Eastman has an uncredited role in this film, playing the masked killer)
 Metamorphosis/Regenerator (1990) a.k.a. DNA Formula Lethal (Eastman directed this film, and had a cameo role in it as well)
 Il Principe del Deserto (TV serial)
 The Son of Sandokan (1998) Made-for-TV movie

References

Footnotes

Sources

External links
 
 Nanarland French B-movie website which reviews several of Eastman's movies

1942 births
Italian male film actors
Living people
Film people from Genoa
Male Spaghetti Western actors
Centro Sperimentale di Cinematografia alumni
Italian screenwriters
Italian male screenwriters
Actors from Genoa